Alessandra Appiano (30 May 1959 – 3 June 2018) was an Italian novelist and journalist.

With her first novel Amiche di salvataggio she won the Bancarella award the following year.

For the same publishing house she made other books sucy as Domani ti perdono (2003), Scegli me (2005), Le vie delle signore sono infinite (2006) and Le belle e le Bestie (2007), four other novels describing - with irony and participation - the feminine universe of our time, also being translated into France, Germany, Portugal, Russia, Poland, Lithuania and Spain.

She published for Garzanti Il cerchio degli amori sospesi (2010) and Solo un uomo (2013), and Ti meriti un amore (2017).

On 3 June 2018 she committed suicide at the age of 59.

References

1959 births
2018 deaths
People from Asti
21st-century Italian novelists
21st-century Italian journalists
2018 suicides
Suicides by jumping in Italy